Piruna is a genus of skippers in the family Hesperiidae.

Species
Piruna aea (Dyar, 1912)
Piruna ajijiciensis  Freeman, 1970
Piruna brunnea  (Scudder, 1872)
Piruna ceracates  (Hewitson, 1874)
Piruna cyclosticta  (Dyar, 1920)
Piruna dampfi  (Bell, 1942)
Piruna gyrans  (Plötz, 1884)
Piruna haferniki  Freeman, 1970
Piruna jonka  Steinhauser, 1991
Piruna kemneri  Freeman, 1990
Piruna maculata  Freeman, 1970
Piruna microsticta  (Godman, [1900])
Piruna millerorum  Steinhauser, 1991
Piruna mullinsi  Freeman, 1991
Piruna penaea  (Dyar, 1918)
Piruna pirus  (Edwards, 1878)
Piruna polingii  (Barnes, 1900)
Piruna purepecha  Warren & González, 1999
Piruna roeveri  (Miller & Miller, 1972)
Piruna sina  Freeman, 1970

References

Butterfly Net International, Higher Classification of Hesperiidae 
Ackery, P., R. de Jong and R. I. Vane-Wright (1999) The Butterflies:  Hedyloidea, Hesperioidea and Papilionoidea. in Lepidoptera, Moths and Butterflies. 1. Evolution, Systematics and Biogeography.  Handbook of Zoology 4(35):263-300 (ed. N. P. Kristensen).  Berlin:  de Gruyter.
 , 1955: A catalogue of the American Hesperiidae indicating the classification and nomenclature adopted in The British Museum (Natural History). 
 , 1970: Journal of the New York Entomological Society 78: 88-99
 , 1979: Nine new species and seven new records of Mexican Hesperiidae. Bulletin of the Allyn Museum 52: 1-13.
 , 1991, A new species of Piruna from Oaxaca, Mexico (Hesperiidae). Journal of the Lepidopterists' Society 45 (1): 42-45. Full article: .
 , 2004, Atlas of Neotropical Lepidoptera; Checklist: Part 4A; Hesperioidea-Papilionoidea.
 , 1998: Notes on the genus Piruna in western Mexico, with description of a new species (Lepidoptera: Hesperiidae). Tropical Lepidoptera Research 9(Suppl. 2): 1-7.

External links
Natural History Museum Lepidoptera genus database

Heteropterinae
Hesperiidae genera